Ethernaut is the fifth full-length release by The Crüxshadows, released in 2003.

Track listing
 "Into the Ether"
 "Cassandra"
 "Love and Hatred"
 "Flame"
 "The Sentiment Inside"
 "Winter Born (This Sacrifice)"
 "Untrue"
 "A Stranger Moment"
 "Waiting to Leave"
 "East"
 "Citadel"
 "After All"
 "Esoterica (Through The Ether)"
 "Helen" *
 "Live Love Be Believe(Recalling The Dream)" *

 There are 19 tracks, but cuts 14, 15, 16 and 18 are silent, "Helen" is track 17 and "Live Love Be Believe" is track 19.

The song "Citadel" is referenced by a character in the 2006 science fiction novel Von Neumann's War, co-written by John Ringo and Travis Taylor, published by Baen Books. The lyrics are quoted in full in the Epilogue. The song "Winter Born (This Sacrifice)" is referenced in several of Ringo's novels, including "Ghost" and "To Sail a Darkling Sea."

Credits 
 Artwork By [Art & Design] – Melissa
 Artwork By [Cover] – Chad Michael Ward
 Guitar, Backing Vocals – Stacey
 Keyboards, Noises [Sounds] – Chris
 Mastered By [With] – CXS, Trevor Brown
 Cover Model – Jessica Lackey
 Photography – Frederik Görges, Jessica Lackey, Sebastian Reichelt
 Producer, Mastered By, Written-By – Rogue
 Violin, Keyboards – Rachel
 Vocals, Lyrics By, Music By – Rogue

References

2003 albums
The Crüxshadows albums